Nicole Melichar and Květa Peschke were the defending champions but Melichar chose not to participate. Peschke partnered alongside Ellen Perez but lost in the semifinals to Gabriela Dabrowski and Luisa Stefani.

Darija Jurak and Andreja Klepač won the title, defeating Dabrowski and Stefani in the final, 6–1, 7–5.

Seeds

Draw

Draw

References

External Links
Main Draw

Silicon Valley Classic - Doubles
2021 Doubles